WORW (91.9 FM, "The Wave") is a high school radio station located in Port Huron Northern High School broadcasting a CHR/Top 40 format. Licensed to Port Huron, Michigan, it first began broadcasting on September 30, 1981.

In fall of 2005, Faculty Advisor Carrie Maggs updated the high school radio station's studio with an automation system allowing the station to begin broadcasting 24 hours a day, 7 days a week. Today the current Faculty Advisor is Ronald Neal and is also a speech teacher and broadcasting teacher.

The current transmission range for the station is approximately 13 miles from the tower at 150watts (located at Port Huron Northern High School).

WORW TV is 91.9FM's student-run and produced TV station also located in Port Huron, Michigan. They started producing news, sports, and community news packages in 2016.

External links
The Wave Facebook
Official Radio Site
Official TV Site
WORW District site

References

Michiguide.com - WORW History

WORW's Official Information Page

ORW
Radio stations established in 1981
High school radio stations in the United States